The Hanoi University of Civil Engineering (HUCE), formerly known as the National University of Civil Engineering (NUCE), is a public higher education institution in Vietnam. The university is one of the leading universities and among the top seven engineering universities in Vietnam.

HUCE is one of four universities participating in educating high-qualified engineers of Vietnamese–French courses. The university also has French-language civil engineering courses supported by AUPELF – a global network of French-speaking higher-education and research institutions.

HUCE was officially founded in 1966 in Hanoi. It is considered to be a large university, teaching more than 18,000 undergraduate students and 2000 post-graduate students. The teaching staff is 699 specialists. The university has international partners which allows its students to participate in exchange programs.

The university has 14 faculties and 54 departments, 16 laboratories and workshops. It offers bachelor's, master's and doctoral degrees. The main campus is in the Hanoi capital, district of Hai Ba Trung.

The university has educated over 60,000 engineers and architects with more than 5,000 masters and doctors. Different generations of the university's lecturers and students have been working throughout the country, contributing profoundly to the national defense and development.

History

Foundation 
In 1956, the University of Science and Technology established the Faculty of Civil Engineering.

In 1966, according to Decision No. 144/CP dated August 8, 1966, the Faculty of Civil Engineering was officially separated into the University of Civil Engineering.

During the Vietnam War, the University of Civil Engineering was evacuated to Huong Canh, Vinh Phuc province. After peace was restored, in 1982, the school began planning to move back to Hanoi. At the end of 1983, the school officially moved back to Hanoi but was dispersed in four different locations: Co Nhue, Phuc Xa, Bach Khoa and Dong Tam.

In 1991, the university was relocated to Dong Tam ward, Hai Ba Trung district, Hanoi. It is current location.

In 2014, the university planned for a new experimental facility in Ha Nam with an area of 24ha.

In 2016, the construction of the H3 lecture hall was completed with a total area floor of 13000m²

In 2017, the university became one of the first four Vietnamese universities to achieve international accreditation standards recognized by the High Council for Evaluation of Research and Higher Education (HCERES).

In 2021, according to Decision No. 1396/QD-TTg dated August 13, 2021, of the prime minister of the Socialist Republic of Vietnam, signed by Deputy Prime Minister Vu Duc Dam, the National University of Civil Engineering was changed to Hanoi University of Civil Engineering.

Development 
Over 60 years of training, 50 years of establishment and development, each step taken by the Hanoi University of Civil Engineering has been closely linked with the development of the industry, the Capital and the country.

The university have developed to become a multi-disciplinary training university offering educational opportunities from graduate to PhD levels as well as to be one of the leading centers in researching and applying scientific and technological advancements in the field of civil engineering and construction. Until now, the university has educated over 60,000 engineers and architects with more than 5,000 masters and doctors. Different generations of the university's lecturers and students have been working throughout the country, contributing to the national defense and development.

With all these considerable achievements, the National University of Civil Engineering has been granted many distinguished rewards. In 2016, on its 50th anniversary, the National University of Civil Engineering was awarded the First-class Independence Order for the second time.

Campuses 
University's campus in Hanoi has a total area of 3.9 ha, including lecture halls of H1 (6 floors) and H2 (4 floors), Library (4 floors), Laboratory (10 floors), Sports Centre (1403m2), convention hall of G3 (900 seats), Administrative Offices of A1 (6 floors) and Dormitory (7464m2/1500 beds). Currently, the university is building its Experimental Training Centre in Nam Cao Residential Area, Phu Ly city of Ha Nam province with an area of over 24 ha.

Lecture halls 

 Total area of lecture halls H1, H2, H3, C4 and laboratory: 17,000 m2
 Total number of classrooms: 99 (50–150 seats/room)
 Laboratory and Workshops: 16

Library 

 Total area: 3590 m2 with 705 seats, including:
 Domestic material reading room: 160 seats
 Foreign material reading room: 70 seats
 Computer-based reading and searching room: 95 seats
 Reading room for PhD learners and lecturers: 35 seats
 Multi-media room: 45 seats
 Self-studying rooms for students: 300 seats

Textbooks and documents 

 Textbook room: 118,878 books
 Domestic material reading room: 20,390 books
 Foreign material reading room: 38,404 books

Academic profile

Faculties 
The university has fourteen faculties:

 Faculty of Architecture and Planning
 Faculty of Bridge and Road Engineering
 Faculty of Building Materials
 Faculty of Civil and Industrial Construction
 Faculty of Economics and Construction Management
 Faculty of Environmental Science and Engineering
 Faculty of Hydraulic Engineering
 Faculty of Information Technology
 Faculty of International Education
 Faculty of Marine and Petroleum Engineering
 Faculty of Mechanical Engineering
 Faculty of National Defense Education
 Faculty of Political Education
 Faculty of Post-graduate Studies

Enrollment 
Every year, it admits over 3500 undergraduate students and 500 graduate students, coming from all over the country and international students.

Education quality 
A degree from the HUCE was evaluated as comparable to four-year bachelor's degree in civil engineering obtained in Canada by International Qualification Assessment Service (IQAS).

Many graduates of HUCE have been admitted into leading North American, Australian and Western European universities for their postgraduate education.

The university’s chancellor

References

Link 
Hanoi University of Civil Engineering's Website
List of universities in Vietnam

Universities in Hanoi